The T/F 11 categorisation of athletics events,  for athletes with the highest level of visual impairment.  at the 2016 Summer Paralympics, take place at the Rio Olympic Stadium from September 8. A total of 19 events are contested in the classifications for which T/F11 athletes are eligible. This includes a number of T/F12 events in which T/F11 athletes are entitled to compete.

For men, there are seven track and three field events at T/F11, while for women there are six track and three field events. In both cases, one of the track events is the T11-13 4 x 100 metres relay.

T/F11 events

Men

Track

T11 100m

T11 200m

T11 400m

18:49 17 September 2016:

T11 1500m

T11 5000m

The Men's 5000 metres T11 event at the 2016 Summer Paralympics took place at the Rio Olympic Stadium on 8 September.
 
The event was undertaken as a single final for all competitors, using guides. It was the first medal awarded at the 2016 Summer Paralympics, and was won by Kenya's Samwel Mushai Kimani, holding off the host's world champion Odair Santos, who took silver ahead of Kenyan Wilson Bii.

 DQ = disqualified RR = Regional Record. PB = Personal Best. SB = Seasonal Best. DNF = Did not finish. DNS = Did not start.

T11-13 4 x 100 metre relay

Road

T12 Marathon
The T12 men's marathon was open to both T12 and T11 competitors.

Field

F11 Long Jump

The Men's long Jump F11 is for athletes with the highest level of visual impairment. Athletes approach the jump blindfolded, guided by a coach or guide. The event was contested on the first morning of the Games on September 8, and Ricardo Costa De Oliveira won gold, the first gold for the host nation at the 2016 Summer Paralympics

F11 Discus

F12 Shot Put

The men's shot put F12 competition was also open to F11 athletes, but no factoring took place. Oney Tapia of Italy was the only F11 athlete to enter, finishing 9th.

Women

Track

T11 100m

The Women's 100 metres T11 event at the 2016 Summer Paralympics will take place at the Rio Olympic Stadium on 8 and 9 September. It features 16 athletes from 11 countries, and expansion form 2012 that has led to the addition of a semi-final round.

The event is for athletes with the highest level of visual disability, and runners run in blindfolds, and are assisted by sighted guides. As such, races contain 4 rather than 8 athletes. Guides of medal winners are also awarded medals.

T11 200m

T11 400m

T11 1500m

T11-13 4 x 100 metre relay

Road

T12 Marathon

Field

F11 Long Jump

F11 Discus

F12 Shot Put

References

Athletics at the 2016 Summer Paralympics